"I Wasn't Kidding" is a song by American recording artist Angie Stone. It was written by Andrea Martin and Adrian Austin for Stone's first compilation album Stone Hits: The Very Best of Angie Stone (2005), while production was overseen by Martin and Vada Nobles. The song is built around a sample from the 1984 record "Baby I'm Scared of You" as written and performed by Womack & Womack.

Critical reception
Billboard felt that "Stone conjures the 1980s with the booty-bumping" song and declared "I Wasn't Kidding" a "fun track, a stellar vocal and deserving entry on Stone Hits: The Very Best of Angie Stone.

Charts

Weekly charts

References

External links
 

2005 songs
2005 singles
Angie Stone songs
Songs written by Andrea Martin (musician)
Songs written by Cecil Womack
Songs written by Linda Womack
J Records singles